Peter Earnest (January 1, 1934 – February 13, 2022) was an American intelligence officer. He was the first director of the International Spy Museum.

Intelligence Career 
Earnest worked at the Central Intelligence Agency for 36 years, largely in Europe and the Middle East. In the late 1970s he helped safeguard Arkady Shevchenko, a United Nations official who became the highest-ranking Soviet official to defect to the United States.

He later worked in the Inspector General’s office and as the CIA’s Senate liaison, concluding his CIA career as the agency’s chief spokesperson.

Books

 with Maryann Karinch, Business Confidential: Lessons for Corporate Success From Inside the C.I.A. (AMACOM, 2010)
 with Lynn M. Boughey, Harry Potter and the Art of Spying (Wise Ink Creative Publishing, 2014)

References 
 

1934 births
2022 deaths
American intelligence analysts
American directors